Two Russian cruisers have been named Bayan:

 , fourth member of the Bayan class, scrapped in the early 1920s

Russian Navy ship names